Coenosia humilis, the tiger fly, is a species of house flies, etc. in the family Muscidae. It is found in Europe and Antarctica.

References

External links

 

Muscidae
Articles created by Qbugbot
Insects described in 1826